The list of ship launches in 1665 includes a chronological list of some ships launched in 1665.


References

1665
Ship launches